The Kingston–Port Ewen Suspension Bridge, sometimes known as the "Rondout Creek bridge", "Old Bridge" or "Wurts Street Bridge", is a steel suspension bridge spanning Rondout Creek, near where it empties into the Hudson River. It connects the City of Kingston to the north, with the village of Port Ewen to the south. Completed in 1921, it was the final link in New York's first north-south highway on the West Shore of the Hudson, and is considered an important engineering accomplishment associated with the development of early motoring.

Construction began in 1916, with a view to replacing the Rondout Creek ferry Skillypot, known for sporadic service. The bridge was designed by the firms of Holton D. Robinson and John A. Roebling's Sons Company, with Holton D. Robinson, Daniel E. Moran, William Yates listed as chief engineers Construction was hampered by local political and financial difficulties, as well as material shortages caused by entry by the United States into World War I, and was suspended until 1920.

When construction resumed, David B. Steinman was among the engineering staff, acting as Assistant Engineer. Completion took about a year, and local legend has it that the contractors employed a woman as a welder: commonplace during World War II, but unheard of in 1920. Ten thousand people attended the bridge's dedication on November 2, 1921. The bridge has a very hilly approach on the north side and crosses a small island in the creek. It forms a dramatic backdrop to the Rondout-West Strand Historic District to the east.

The bridge was closed on September 25, 2020, for a three-year reconstruction project that is estimated to cost $44.6 million.

See also 

 List of crossings of Rondout Creek
 List of bridges and tunnels on the National Register of Historic Places in New York
 National Register of Historic Places listings in Ulster County, New York

References

External links 

 description from National Park Service website
 ca. 1922 image from National Park Service website

Suspension bridges in New York (state)
Bridges completed in 1921
Bridges in Ulster County, New York
Road bridges on the National Register of Historic Places in New York (state)
National Register of Historic Places in Ulster County, New York
Kingston, New York
Bridges over Rondout Creek
U.S. Route 9W
Steel bridges in the United States